The 1947 Boston Yanks season was their fourth in the National Football League. The team improved on their previous season's output of 2–8–1, winning four games. They failed to qualify for the playoffs for the fourth consecutive season.

Before the season

Draft

Schedule

Standings

References

1947
Boston Yanks
Boston Yanks